The Commissioner for Older People for Northern Ireland is set up as a non-departmental public body, established by the  Commissioner for Older People Act (Northern Ireland) 2011. The Commissioner has a number of legal functions and powers directly linked to the legislation. The Commissioner's office is sponsored by the Executive Office of Northern Ireland. The Commissioner is independent and the principal aim of their office is to safeguard and promote the interests of older people. The current Commissioner for Older People for Northern Ireland is Eddie Lynch.

Key duties 

The Commissioner's key duties are:
 To promote awareness of the interests of older people in Northern Ireland.
 To keep under review the adequacy and effectiveness of the law as it affects older people.
 To keep under review the adequacy and effectiveness of services provided to older people by "relevant authorities" who include health and social care providers.
 To promote the provision of opportunities for and the elimination of discrimination against older people.
 To encourage best practice in the treatment of older people.
 To promote positive attitudes towards older people and encourage participation by older people in public life.
 To advise the Assembly, the Secretary of State and any relevant authority on matters concerning the interests of older people.
 To take reasonable steps to communicate with older people.

The Commissioner's general powers
The law states that the Commissioner may:
 Make arrangements for research or educational activities concerning the interests of older people.
 Issue guidance on best practice in relation to any matter concerning the interests of older people.
 Conduct investigations for the purpose of any of their functions.
 Compile and publish information concerning the interests of older people.
 Provide advice or information on any matter concerning the interests of older people.

References 

 https://web.archive.org/web/20130602111201/http://www.northernireland.gov.uk/index/media-centre/news-departments/news-ofmdfm/news-archive-ofmdfm-october-2011/news-ofmdfm-031011-first-commissioner-for.htm
 http://www.ageuk.org.uk/northern-ireland/latest-news/archive/commissioner-for-older-peolpe-ni/
 https://www.bbc.co.uk/news/uk-northern-ireland-22389786

External links 

 
 Commissioner for Older People Act 2011(Commencement) Order (Northern Ireland) 2012

Human rights
Elder law
Non-Departmental Public Bodies of the Northern Ireland Executive